Phyllostegia brevidens, the Mauna Kea phyllostegia, is a plant species in the family Lamiaceae first described in 1862. It is found on Hawaii (Big Island) and on Maui.

References

brevidens
Endemic flora of Hawaii
Flora without expected TNC conservation status